The following page lists power stations in Ukraine.

Nuclear

In service

Historic

Hydroelectric

Thermal

Solar

Wind 

  - 200 MWp
  - 500 MWp
  - 67,5 MWp
  - 200 MWp
  - 565 MWp
  - 107,5 MWp
  - 25 MWp
  - 246 MWp
  - 100 MWp

See also 

List of power stations in Europe
List of largest power stations in the world
DTEK
Energy Company of Ukraine

References

Ukraine
Lists of buildings and structures in Ukraine